Parineeta (English: The Bride) is a 1986 Bangladeshi film starring Ilias Kanchan and Anjana Sultana opposite him. Both the actor and the actress garnered Bangladesh National Film Awards.  It won National Film Awards in three categories that year and Bachsas Awards in seven categories.

Cast 
 Ilias Kanchan
 Anjana Sultana

Music
The film's music was composed by Sheikh Sadi Khan.

Awards 
Bangladesh National Film Awards
Best Actor - Ilias Kanchan
Best Actress - Anjana Sultana
Best Supporting Actor - Ashish Kumar Louha

Bachsas Awards
Best Film - Alamgir Kabir
Best Director - Alamgir Kabir
Best Actor - Ilias Kanchan
Best Actress - Anjana Sultana
Best Supporting Actor - Ashish Kumar Louha
Best Female Playback Singer - Nilufar Yasmin
Best Cinematographer - Maksudul Bari Chowdhury

References

1986 films
Bengali-language Bangladeshi films
Films scored by Sheikh Sadi Khan
1980s Bengali-language films
Films directed by Alamgir Kabir
Best Film Bachsas Award winners